Paul Anthony Rawden (born 15 July 1973) is a former English cricketer. Rawden was a right-handed batsman who bowled right-arm medium pace. He was born in Stamford, Lincolnshire.

Rawden made his debut for Lincolnshire in the 1992 MCCA Knockout Trophy against Cumberland. Rawden played Minor counties cricket for Lincolnshire from 1992 to 1997, which included 39 Minor Counties Championship matches and 11 MCCA Knockout Trophy matches. He made his List A debut against Glamorgan in the 1994 NatWest Trophy. He played 2 further List A matches for Lincolnshire, against Gloucestershire in the 1996 NatWest Trophy and Derbyshire in the 1997 NatWest Trophy. In his 3 matches, he scored 21 runs at an average of 7.00, with a high score of 21, with Rawden scoring ducks in two of his three innings.

References

External links
Paul Rawden at ESPNcricinfo
Paul Rawden at CricketArchive

1973 births
Living people
People from Stamford, Lincolnshire
English cricketers
Lincolnshire cricketers